Robert Bruce (19 June 1922 – 16 June 2001) was a Scotland international rugby union player.

Rugby Union career

Amateur career

He played for Gordonians. He was the first Gordonians player to be capped for Scotland.

Provincial career

Bruce was capped for North of Scotland District.

He played for the combined North of Scotland District side (a defacto North and Midlands side) in their match against Australia in October 1947.

He turned out for the Scotland Probables side on 20 December 1947.

International career

He was capped 4 times for Scotland in the period 1947 to 1948.

Administrative career

He was the North of Scotland district secretary for many years.

Banking career

He joined Aberdeen Savings Bank at the age of 18, and became manager of their Stornoway branch in 1952.

While in Stornoway he founded Stornoway RFC.

References

1922 births
2001 deaths
Rugby union players from Aberdeen
Scottish rugby union players
Scotland international rugby union players
Gordonians RFC players
North of Scotland (standalone) players
North of Scotland (combined side) players
Scotland Probables players
Rugby union props